Pseudoclavellaria is a genus of insects belonging to the family Cimbicidae.

The species of this genus are found in Europe and Russia.

Species:
 Clavellaria autochthna (Zhang, 1989) 
 Clavellaria longiclava (Zhang, 1989)

References

Cimbicidae
Sawfly genera